István Joós (born March 27, 1953) is a Hungarian sprint canoeist who competed in the late 1970s and early 1980s. He won a silver medal in the K-2 1000 m event at the 1980 Summer Olympics in Moscow.

Joós also won three medals at the ICF Canoe Sprint World Championships with two silvers (K-2 10000 m: 1981, K-4 10000 m: 1977) and a bronze (K-1 10000 m: 1978).

References

Sports-reference.com profile

1953 births
Canoeists at the 1980 Summer Olympics
Hungarian male canoeists
Living people
Olympic canoeists of Hungary
Olympic silver medalists for Hungary
Olympic medalists in canoeing
ICF Canoe Sprint World Championships medalists in kayak
Medalists at the 1980 Summer Olympics
20th-century Hungarian people